Cephalophus is a mammal genus which contains at least fifteen species of duiker, a type of small antelope.

Species
Following Groves (2005), the species within Cephalophus include:
 Aders's duiker Cephalophus adersi
 Brooke's duiker Cephalophus brookei
 Peters' duiker Cephalophus callipygus
 Bay duiker Cephalophus dorsalis
 Jentink's duiker Cephalophus jentinki
 White-bellied duiker Cephalophus leucogaster
 Red duiker Cephalophus natalensis
 Black duiker Cephalophus niger
 Black-fronted duiker Cephalophus nigrifrons
 Ogilby's duiker Cephalophus ogilbyi
 Ruwenzori duiker Cephalophus rubidus
 Red-flanked duiker Cephalophus rufilatus
 Yellow-backed duiker Cephalophus silvicultor
 Abbott's duiker Cephalophus spadix
 Weyns's duiker Cephalophus weynsi
 Zebra duiker Cephalophus zebra

References

Mammal genera
Duikers
Taxa named by Charles Hamilton Smith